The Hermit language is an extinct West Manus language formerly spoken on Hermit, Luf and Maron Islands in western Manus Province, Papua New Guinea. It has been replaced by Seimat.

References

Manus languages
Languages of Manus Province
Extinct languages of Oceania
Critically endangered languages